Urge Overkill is an American alternative rock band, formed in Chicago, consisting of Nathan Kaatrud, who took the stage name Nash Kato (vocals/guitar), and Eddie "King" Roeser (vocals/guitar/bass guitar). They are widely known for their song "Sister Havana" and their cover of Neil Diamond's "Girl, You'll Be a Woman Soon", which was used in Quentin Tarantino's Pulp Fiction. Oui, their latest album, was released in 2022.

History
Kato and Roeser met at Northwestern University in 1985. They formed Urge Overkill (getting the name from a phrase in the lyrics of the Parliament song "Funkentelechy") in Chicago in 1986, with drummer Pat Byrne, and released an EP, Strange, I..., on Ruthless Records. The EP was recorded by Kato's friend Steve Albini. The full-length album Jesus Urge Superstar soon followed, again produced by Albini, and with Kriss Bataille on the drums.

Americruiser saw a  change in style. Jack "Jaguar" Watt (of the band Baron Lesh) was the drummer and their sound from then on has been described as a "Stonesy fusion of arena rock and punk". Produced by Butch Vig, Americruiser was widely praised, and scored a college radio hit with the lead single "Ticket to L.A." Watt returned to Baron Lesh and was replaced by Blackie Onassis (real name: John Rowan) on the next album The Supersonic Storybook, which was named by Material Issue's Jim Ellison and was released in 1991.

After opening for Nirvana on the American Nevermind tour, Urge Overkill returned to the studio to record another EP Stull in 1992, which featured the tracks "Girl, You'll Be a Woman Soon" (produced and mixed by Kramer) and "Goodbye to Guyville". Having a strong following by this time, they jumped from their indie label Touch & Go to Geffen Records. Despite some criticism for the label switch, Urge Overkill's major-label debut Saturation received strong reviews upon release in 1993, and to support the album, they opened for Pearl Jam on their Vs. tour. The single "Sister Havana" gave the band a hit record and broad recognition.

In 1993, the band contributed the track "Take a Walk" to the AIDS relief benefit album No Alternative produced by the Red Hot Organization. As the band recorded a follow-up album, cult filmmaker Quentin Tarantino used the group's cover version of the Neil Diamond song "Girl, You'll Be a Woman Soon" in his 1994 film Pulp Fiction. When the movie became a hit, the song made it to number 59 on the Billboard Hot 100.

Urge Overkill retained their sound for Exit the Dragon, released in 1995. Kato and Roeser started feuding, resulting in Roeser leaving the band. Roeser went on to perform with Jim Kimball (formerly of The Jesus Lizard) as L.I.M.E. and with his brother John in the band Electric Airlines. Now a duo consisting of Kato and Onassis, Urge Overkill moved to Sony's 550 Music in early 1997.

After a break of several years, Kato released a solo album in 2000 titled Debutante. Six of the album's 13 songs were co-written with Onassis.

In 2004, Kato and Roeser reformed Urge Overkill without Onassis, recruiting former Gaza Strippers guitarist Mike "Hadji" Hodgkiss to play bass, keyboardist Chris Frantisak, and drummer Nate Arling. The reformed Urge Overkill performed shows at The Troubadour in West Hollywood, Double Door in Chicago, First Avenue in Minneapolis and the Bowery Ballroom in New York and continued to tour through Europe, North America, and Australia.

On September 19, 2010, on the free form radio program Anything Anything with Rich Russo on WRXP-FM in New York, the first Urge Overkill song in 15 years was played. The song was called "Effigy". Russo also announced an Urge Overkill show on October 4, 2010 at Mercury Lounge in New York. Live shows began happening, including being the musical guest at a "Roast of Quentin Tarantino" on December 1, 2010. The band released Rock & Roll Submarine, their first studio album in 16 years, in May 2011. A subsequent tour followed the release of the album. On October 8, 2011, Urge Overkill opened for Weezer at the Red Bull Riot Fest at the Congress Theater in Chicago.

Urge Overkill had continued to perform live occasionally from 2012 to 2018. By 2019, the band had begun working on new material for the follow-up to Rock & Roll Submarine. Oui, their first studio album in 11 years, was released on January 28, 2022.

Discography

Studio albums

Extended plays

Live albums

Compilation albums

Singles

Compilation appearances
 Hog Butcher For The World (Mad Queen Records) (1987) - "Last Train To Heaven"

References

External links
 Official website
 www.urgeoverkill.com - Latest tour dates/Mood Control
 
 Urge Overkill at Rolling Stone

Musical groups established in 1986
Musical groups disestablished in 1997
Musical groups reestablished in 2004
Touch and Go Records artists
Geffen Records artists
Ruthless Records (Chicago) artists
Alternative rock groups from Chicago
Musical groups from Illinois
1986 establishments in Illinois